Eric Emil Lindroth (September 12, 1951 – June 17, 2019) was a water polo player from the United States, who won the bronze medal with the Men's National Team at the 1972 Summer Olympics in Munich, West Germany. In 1988, he was inducted into the USA Water Polo Hall of Fame.

See also
 List of Olympic medalists in water polo (men)

References

External links
 
 Eric Lindroth's obituary

1951 births
2019 deaths
American male water polo players
Water polo players at the 1972 Summer Olympics
Olympic bronze medalists for the United States in water polo
Place of birth missing
Medalists at the 1972 Summer Olympics